Apocalyptica is the fifth studio album by the Finnish symphonic metal band of same name. Although Mikko Sirén has been with Apocalyptica two years prior to this release, he was not an official member of the band until after this release, but this is still his first release with the band along with the band having a drummer for their first time. 

The song "Life Burns!" is featured on the soundtrack of the video game Burnout Revenge. "Deathzone" ends at 4:34, after that, there is 2:06 of silence and at 6:40, a hidden track, "En Vie" starts, which is 3:27 long. The tracks 1, 4, 7, 9, 11 (Both) & "Wie Weit" were on Amplified // A Decade of Reinventing the Cello.

Track listing

Reception

In 2005, Apocalyptica was ranked number 483 in Rock Hard magazine's book of The 500 Greatest Rock & Metal Albums of All Time.

Credits

Apocalyptica
Eicca Toppinen – cello, programming, music (1–6, 10, 11 & special edition bonus tracks)
Perttu Kivilaakso – cello, programming, music (7–9)
Paavo Lötjönen – cello

Additional personnel

Drummers
Mikko Sirén – on (1–8 & 10–14); programming
Dave Lombardo – on "Betrayal/Forgiveness"

Vocalists / Lyricists
Bittersweet
Lauri Ylönen – also on "Life Burns!"
Ville Valo

Quutamo/Wie Weit/How Far/En Vie
Manu – on "En Vie"
Marta Jandová – on "How Far" & "Wie Weit"

Double bassist
Mikko Moilanen – on "Betrayal/Forgiveness" & "Deathzone"

Writers on "My Friend of Misery"
Songwriter
James Hetfield

Co-Composers
Lars Ulrich
Jason Newsted

Writers on "South of Heaven" / "Mandatory Suicide""
Tom Araya
Jeff Hanneman
Kerry King

Charts

Weekly charts

Year-end charts

References

Apocalyptica albums
2005 albums
Classical albums
Instrumental albums